The Shaikhda or Shaikhra are a Muslim community found in the state of Gujarat and Bihar in India.

History and origin

The Shaikhda are a community who are the devotees of the Sufi preacher Bala Mohammad Shah. Historically the community was one which followed a syncretic belief system, which incorporated several elements of Hindu customs, included the usage of Brahmin priests. Many were once also members of the Swaminarayan sect.

Present circumstances

The community is found mainly in Ahmedabad and Baroda districts and [[Bihar districts| Araria| Purnea and Kishanganj] districts . Also They have abandoned many of their syncretic practices, and are now fairly orthodox Sunni Muslims. The Shaikhda are mainly an urban community, and many are now petty traders. They are endogamous, marrying close kin.

References

Social groups of Gujarat
Muslim communities of India
Shaikh clans
Muslim communities of Gujarat